The Gibraltar Defence Police (GDP) is a civil police force which provides a policing and security service for the Ministry of Defence in Gibraltar. Prior to 17 December 2009 it was known as the Gibraltar Services Police (GSP).

Overview

The Gibraltar Defence Police is one of three civilian police forces within the UK Ministry of Defence. Officers are sworn under the Police Act of the Laws of Gibraltar. The Chief of Police is currently Rob Allen. An independent civilian police force which also provides civilian unarmed guards, the Chief of Police is responsible to the Commander, British Forces Gibraltar.

Structure
In 2020, the strength of the force was: one chief of police, one deputy chief of police, two chief inspectors, five inspectors, 14 sergeants, 72 constables, together with civilian support staff and uniformed guards.

Headquarters
Since 2016 the GDP has shared a purpose-built headquarters with the British Armed Forces Joint Provost and Security Unit (JPSU) (military police) at HM Naval Base Gibraltar.

Pay and conditions
Pay and conditions of the force are identical to those of the Ministry of Defence Police (MDP) in the United Kingdom, of which it is a direct equivalent. The Gibraltar Defence Police Federation represents the interests of police officers up to the rank of chief inspector.

Specialist units

Firearms
There is no specialist firearms unit. Like the MDP, all GDP officers are trained in the use of firearms.

Marine unit
The force has a Marine Unit, founded in 1998, which consists of a sergeant and over 20 constables. It is charged with the seaward defence of Gibraltar's Royal Navy facilities and the warships moored in them, and also assists the Royal Gibraltar Police Marine Section with general security and enforcement patrols of waters surrounding Gibraltar. It operates two motor launches and two rigid-hulled inflatable boats (RHIBs). The original  motor launches of 1998 were replaced in 2003 with larger and faster  launches. One of these was itself replaced with a newer boat in 2012. Since 2011, the police marine unit has shared a headquarters and boathouse with the Gibraltar Squadron of the Royal Navy. The boathouse holds the Navy's five patrol boats and RHIBs, and the police's four patrol boats and RHIBs.

Dog section
The GDP dog section was formed in 2012, and consists of a team of handlers, led by a sergeant, and six general purpose dogs. The initial six dogs are of the Belgian Shepherd Dog (Malinois) and Dutch Shepherd Dog breeds. The GDP previously relied on service dogs and handlers seconded from United Kingdom police forces, but as part of the GDP Project Euston, which seeks to replace all secondment from UK forces with locally provided Gibraltarian services, the GDP dog section has been established.

Drugs intelligence
The force seconds officers to the Gibraltar Co-ordinating Centre for Criminal Intelligence and Drugs (GCID).

Ranks
The rank structure of the GDP follows other British police forces, with ranks from chief officer down to constable.

Gallery
A collection of photographs of the GDP:

See also
Royal Gibraltar Police
His Majesty's Customs (Gibraltar)
Border and Coastguard Agency (Gibraltar)
Law of Gibraltar
British Overseas Territories
List of law enforcement agencies in the United Kingdom, Crown Dependencies and British Overseas Territories

References

External links
GSP Marine Unit

Gibraltar
Ministry of Defence Police
Law enforcement agencies of Gibraltar
2000s establishments in Gibraltar
2009 establishments in British Overseas Territories
Civilian police forces of defense ministries